

Incumbents
 Prime Minister: Godfrey Huggins

Events
  Monuments and Relics Act 1936, replaces the 1902 Ancient Monuments Protection Ordinance and 1912 Bushmen Relics Ordinance

Births
 5 March - Canaan Sodindo Banana, Methodist minister, theologian and the first President of Zimbabwe (died 2003)

References

 
Years of the 20th century in Southern Rhodesia
Zimbabwe
Zimbabwe, 1936 In